"Fake Magic" is a song by Australian electronic music duo Peking Duk featuring English musical duo AlunaGeorge. The song was released in June 2017, and peaked at number 34 on the Australian ARIA Charts. 

In 2022, the band created a non-alcoholic beer named ‘Fake Magic Lager’ after the track. The lager was created in collaboration with First Nations owned non-alcoholic drinks company Sobah Beverages, as part of a sustainability initiative for ING Australia.

Reception
Kat Bein from Billboard described "Fake Magic" as "hip house pop with a tinge of darkness to keep things interesting."

Triple J dubbed the song "a lush, funky throwback jam with a tasty, punctuated vocal line from Aluna. Like most of the mega-singles in their back catalogue, 'Fake Magic' is a strut-ready d-floor banger."

Track listing

Charts

Certifications

References

Peking Duk songs
2017 singles
2017 songs
Sony Music Australia singles
Songs written by Sam Littlemore